The Marist Richmond Brothers were a New Zealand rugby league franchise that played in the Bartercard Cup. They were a joint venture between two Auckland Rugby League clubs, the Richmond Bulldogs and the Marist Saints. In 2005 the competition was reorganised and the club, along with the Mt Albert Lions, formed the Auckland Lions. Despite this many former players and the coach instead became involved in the Waitakere Rangers franchise.

Notable players

Notable players included: Motu Tony, Misi Taulapapa, Karl Guttenbeil, Marcus Perenara, Tevita Latu, Steve Matai, Jerome Ropati, Paletasala Ale, Evarn Tuimavave, Saia Makisi, Daniel Vasau, Vae Kalolo and Tangi Ropati.

Results
 
The Brothers started the competition poorly, missing the playoffs in the first two years. However they turned things around for 2002 and made the playoffs for the first time. In 2003 they finished third on the table but then went on the qualify for the Grand Final, losing to the Canterbury Bulls. They dominated in 2004, claiming the Minor Premiership but went down to the Mt Albert Lions in the finals. They again missed the playoffs in 2005, their final season in the competition.

*Two points for a bye awarded as the Ngongotaha Chiefs left the competition.

References
 NZRL Brothers Page

Auckland rugby league clubs
Rugby clubs established in 2000
Defunct rugby league teams in New Zealand
Marist Saints
Richmond Bulldogs
2000 establishments in New Zealand
2005 disestablishments in New Zealand